Luce Bay is a large bay in Wigtownshire in southern Scotland.  The bay is 20 miles wide at its mouth and is bounded by the Rhins of Galloway to the west and the Machars to the east.  The Scares are rocky islets at the mouth of the bay.

Bombing range
From the 1930s to the 1990s, it was a bombing range used for training purposes by RAF aircraft (and later allied aircraft on a leasing basis) based at West Freugh.  Discharged bombs were retrieved by a retired minesweeper based at Drummore. It is still a licensed Ministry of Defence range with byelaws restricting access during test and evaluation activities conducted by QinetiQ on behalf of the MOD.

Once an important commercial fishery, Luce Bay is now seldom used for this purpose.  It contains important marine and littoral life, and has been declared a Special Area of Conservation by Scottish Natural Heritage

Places on Luce Bay coastline
Ardwell, Auchenmalg
Chappel Rossan
Drummore
Glenluce
River Luce
Maryport, Mull of Galloway
Monreith
Port William
Sandhead
Terrally Bay, Torrs Warren

See also
 Deep Sea Range on the Outer Hebrides
 RAF Tain on the Moray Firth

References

External links
 Qinetiq

Bays of Scotland
Bombing ranges
History of Dumfries and Galloway
Landforms of Dumfries and Galloway
Military installations in Scotland
Solway Firth
Bays of the Irish Sea